Gongsun Zan (before 161 - April or May 199), courtesy name Bogui, was a Chinese military general, politician, and warlord who lived during the late Eastern Han dynasty.

Life

Little is known of Gongsun Zan's early life. He and Liu Bei studied under the tutelage of Lu Zhi. At the time, the administrator of his home commandery appreciated Gongsun Zan's impressive looks and booming voice, so he arranged for his daughter to marry him. Gongsun Zan was deployed by He Jin to quash rebellions in the north which he did successfully. Following a misunderstanding with his lord, Liu Yu, Gongsun attacked Liu and killed him, thus winning control of the surrounding areas. However, contrary to popular belief, he was never formally appointed as a commandery administrator. During this time, his former classmate Liu Bei came to serve him and was allocated the city of Pingyuan to defend.

 
To the south, the two brothers Yuan Shao in the north and Yuan Shu in the south vied for supremacy over central China. Gongsun Zan formed an alliance with Yuan Shu and sent his second cousin, Gongsun Yue, to help Yuan Shu's general, Sun Jian, retake Yangcheng. However, Gongsun Yue died in the campaign. Using this as pretext, Gongsun Zan attacked Yuan Shao after his initial plan to gain Han Fu's lands went awry. However, Gongsun Zan was defeated by Yuan Shao at the Battle of Yijing. He committed suicide by setting himself on fire, after killing his sisters, wife and children.

Family
 Gongsun Yue, Gongsun Zan's younger second cousin. Gongsun Zan sent him with 1,000 troops and supplies to assist the warlord Yuan Shu, who was in a proxy war with his half-brother Yuan Shao. Gongsun Yue died after being hit by a stray arrow during the Battle of Yangcheng in 191 while fighting alongside Sun Jian (Yuan Shu's proxy) against Zhou Yu (Renming) (Yuan Shao's proxy). Gongsun Zan used Gongsun Yue's death as an excuse to declare war on Yuan Shao.
 In the 14th-century historical novel Romance of the Three Kingdoms, Gongsun Yue is Gongsun Zan's younger brother. Gongsun Zan sends Gongsun Yue as a messenger to demand that Yuan Shao keep his promise by dividing Ji Province between him and Gongsun Zan after seizing it from Han Fu, but Yuan Shao refuses. While Gongsun Yue is on his return journey, Yuan Shao orders his men to pretend to be Dong Zhuo's soldiers and then ambush and kill Gongsun Yue. Gongsun Zan sees through Yuan Shao's ruse and subsequently declares war on him.
 Gongsun Fan, Gongsun Zan's younger second cousin. He leads troops from Bohai Commandery to join Gongsun Zan. He also fought in the Battle of Jieqiao alongside Gongsun Zan against Yuan Shao.
 Gongsun Xu, Gongsun Zan's son. During the Battle of Yijing (198–199), Gongsun Zan sent him to seek reinforcements from the Heishan bandits led by Zhang Yan. They returned too late as Gongsun Zan had already been defeated by Yuan Shao and had committed suicide along with the rest of his family. Gongsun Xu later met his end at the hands of the Tuge, a Xiongnu tribe.

In Romance of the Three Kingdoms
Gongsun Zan is a character in the 14th-century historical novel Romance of the Three Kingdoms, which romanticises the events before and during the Three Kingdoms period of China. He leads an elite cavalry unit called the "White Riders" and has served on the northern and eastern frontiers of the Han Empire by defending the borders from incursions by various non-Han Chinese tribes. In 191, Gongsun Zan joins the coalition against Dong Zhuo, the warlord who seized power in Luoyang and holds the figurehead Emperor Xian hostage. After the coalition breaks up, he gets into a rivalry with Yuan Shao over the territories in northern China and engages him in a series of battles throughout the 190s, starting with the Battle of Jieqiao and ending with his defeat and death at the Battle of Yijing.

In the novel, Gongsun Zan is nicknamed "White Horse General" because the elite cavalry unit he leads is made up completely of horses of pure white. The reason for doing so is that he knows that the non-Han Chinese tribes consider white horses sacred animals so they will run away when they encounter an enemy unit riding white horses in battle.

In Records of the Three Kingdoms

Gongsun Zan's white horse volunteers has historical basis, and appears in the historical records as an elite mounted unit on white horses which formed the core of his fighting force. The Records of Three Kingdoms describes how their "flags and armour lit up Heaven and Earth" at the Battle of Jieqiao.

In Popular Culture
Gongsun Zan is one of the main playable characters of the video game Total War: Three Kingdoms, developed by Creative Assembly and published by Sega.

See also
 Lists of people of the Three Kingdoms

References

Citations

Bibliography
 Chen, Shou (3rd century). Records of the Three Kingdoms (Sanguozhi).
 
 Fan, Ye (5th century). Book of the Later Han (Houhanshu).
 Luo, Guanzhong (14th century). Romance of the Three Kingdoms (Sanguo Yanyi).
 Pei, Songzhi (5th century). Annotations to Records of the Three Kingdoms (Sanguozhi zhu).

199 deaths
2nd-century births
Chinese politicians who committed suicide
Familicides

Han dynasty generals from Hebei
Han dynasty politicians from Hebei
Han dynasty warlords
Murder–suicides in China
Political office-holders in Beijing
Political office-holders in Hebei
Politicians from Tangshan
Suicides by self-immolation
Suicides in the Han dynasty
Year of birth unknown